The Whitten Soccer Complex was the on-campus soccer complex for the Belmont Bruins of Belmont University in Nashville, Tennessee, the largest Christian university in Tennessee.

The facility was a Bermuda grass based field surrounded by a walking track, which had bleacher seating for 500 spectators plus standing room if needed.

It was replaced by the field at E. S. Rose Park in 2012.

References

External links
 Information at Belmont Bruins athletics
 Satellite view from Google Maps

Belmont Bruins soccer
Soccer venues in Tennessee
College soccer venues in the United States
Sports venues in Nashville, Tennessee
Sports complexes in the United States